The Chola military was the combined armed forces of the Chola Empire organized during two separate Tamil golden ages, the Sangam Period and the Medieval Era. The Chola military fought dozens of wars, it also underwent numerous changes in structure, organization, equipment and tactics, while conserving a core of lasting Tamil traditions.

Sangam period (300 BC–300 AD)
It has not been possible to assemble an internal chronology of the Sangam works and pinpoint when and how the early Chola military was formed. The earliest mention of the Chola army comes from Indian historian, K. A. Nilakanta Sastri, who claimed that King Ilamchetchenni defeated Maurya Empire King Bindusara, son of Chandragupta Maurya, in battle. Fragmentary poems in the Purananuru also state that, Ilamchetchenni Chola, revered as a brave king and hard fighter, successfully resisted the exploration of the Mauryan army in Tamilakam.

Karikala Chola

Karikala Chola stands pre-eminent amongst all those mentioned in Pattinappaalai. 'Karikala' means 'elephant feller' or 'charred leg', which is assumed to be a reference to an accident by fire that befell the prince early in his life. Pattinappaalai describes this accident and the enterprising way in which the prince escaped and established himself on the Chola throne. Pattinappalai is a poem on the then Chola capital Kaveripattinam and describes the numerous battles Karikala fought against the Cheras and Pandyas, including the famous Battle of Venni where the Chola army defeated a confederacy of (about) a dozen rulers headed by Chera and Pandya kings. Following the battle, the Chera king was disgraced (received a wound on his back) and committed suicide. Karikala thus broke the confederacy that was formed against him, conquered the Chera and Pandya kingdoms, and established Chola hegemony over Tamilakam. After the Battle of Venni, Karikala defeated the confederacy of nine minor chieftains in the Battle of Vakaipparandalai. He also invaded Sri Lanka and took away, among other things, 12,000 Sinhalese men to work as slaves in the construction of the Kallanai Dam.

The poet Kovur Kilar mentions a protracted civil war between two Chola chieftains Nalankilli and Nedunkilli. Nedunkilli isolated himself in a fort in Avur, which was being besieged by Mavalattan, Nalankilli's younger brother. The poet chided Nedunkilli to come out and fight like a man instead of causing untold misery to the people of the city. In another poem, the poet begs both the princes to give up the civil war as whoever wins, the loser will be a Chola.

Kalavali by Poygayar mentions the Chola King Kocengannan and his battle with the Chera king Kanaikkal Irumporai. The Chera was taken prisoner and Poygayar, who was a friend of the Chera, sang a poem praising the Chola King Kochchenganan in 40 stanzas. The Chola king, pleased with the work, released the Chera. Kalavali describes the battle fought at Kalumalam, near the Chera capital. Kocengannan is one of the 63 nayanars. Kocengannan became the subject of many instances in later times and is portrayed as a pious Siva devotee who built many fine temples for Siva along the banks of the river Kaveri.

Medieval Chola army 
The Chola dynasty faded into darkness after c. 300 CE. During this period, the Cholas lost their sovereignty in Tamilakam and held on to their old capital city of Urayur by serving as a vassal state under the Kalabhra and Pallava dynasties. Making use of the opportunity during a war between the Pandyas and Pallavas, Vijayalaya Chola rose out of obscurity and captured Thanjavur and re-established the Chola dynasty. In 852 CE, Vijayalaya Chola declared war on the Pandyas and defeated them. The Cholas became so powerful that the Pallavas were also wiped out from the Thanjavur region at a later stage. The Medieval Chola Empire traced their ancestry to the ancient Tamil King, Karikala, making him the dynasty's ancestral father.

Organization and administration 
Cholas recruited military personnel of four types: soldiers of hereditary military families, soldiers raised from various tribes, personnel provided by various tradesman and merchants, and mercenaries.

In addition to the divisions, there were the Nadapu—the commissariat and Payanam—the admiralty and logistics. The addition to these, bureaucratic reforms revolutionized the Chola Army, resulting in victories on a massive scale.

Famous generals 

There were hundreds of generals in the Medieval Chola Army, some notable commanders include: 
Senathipathi Araiyan Rajarajan (11th century)
Younger brother of Rajendra Chola I and highest ranking general of the Chola Army during their victories against the Western Chalukya dynasty, Somavamsi dynasty, the Pala Kingdom, and the Kamboja Pala dynasty
 Senathipathi Abrameya pallavan, was the commander in chief of Rajaraja chola. 
 He was the commander in kandalur salai battle 988CE and also in kudamalai battle in 994 CE where the Prince Rajendra lead the forces.
Senathipathi Vallavaraiyan Vandiyadevan (10th–11th century)
 Commander of the Sri Lanka Front Army of Rajaraja l and Rajendra I during the Chola conquest of Anuradhapura
Senathipathi Karunakara Tondaiman (Late 11th century)
 Famous general during the reign of Kulottunga Chola I that defeated the Kalinga armies of King Anantavarman and went on to plunder Lanka
The Karunakara Pillaiyar temple in the Jaffna peninsula was built after him. The village, Thondaimanaru, in Ceylon was also named after him
Senathipathi Naralokaviran (Late 11th century) 
General during the reign of Kulottunga Chola I and his successor Vikrama Chola that led many Chola campaigns in the deep south and distinguished himself in the Pandya Wars
Senathipathi Paluvettaraiyar Maravan Kandanar (Late 10th century)
An important general during the reign of Parantaka Chola II who strengthened the Pazhuvettaraiyar regiment that was actively deployed during the Chola conquest of Anuradhapura
Thalapathi Thiruchitrambalamudaiyan Perumanambi (Late 12th century)
Defeated Polonnaruwa Army generals Lankapura Dandanatha and Jagad Vijaya in battle and successfully re-conquered the Pandyan Kingdom on behalf of Rajadhiraja Chola II during the Pandyan Civil War (1169–1177)
Anipathi Annan Pallavarayan (Late 12th century)
Invaded Polonnaruwa and destroyed Parakramabahu's preparations for the invasion of Chola Nadu and provided support for Sinhalese Prince Sri Vallabha, nephew of Parakramabahu and a rival claimant to the Polonnaruwa throne

Regiments 

Chola inscriptions mention numerous regiments by specific names. Rajaraja Chola I created a powerful standing army and a considerable navy, which achieved even greater success under his son Rajendra Chola I. The prominence given to the army from the conquest of the Pandyas down to the last year of the king's reign is significant and shows the spirit with which the king treated his soldiers. Rajaraja evidently gave his army its due share in the glory derived from his extensive conquests. The army composed chiefly of Kaikolars (men with stronger arms), which were royal troops receiving regular payments from the treasury (e.g. Arul mozhideva-terinda-kaikola padai; in this, arulmozhideva is the king's name, terinda means well known, and padai means regime).
 
The following regiments are mentioned in the Tanjavur inscriptions:

 Uttama- Chola-terinda-Andalagattalar
 Perundanattu Anaiyatkal — Elephant corps.
 Pandita-Chola-Terinda-villigal — Archers
 Nigarili- Chola terinda-Udanilai-Kudiraichchevagar — Cavalry
 Mummadi- Chola-terinda-Anaippagar — Elephant corps
 Vira- Chola-Anukkar
 Parantaka-Kongavalar — Light Infantry
 Mummadi- Chola-terinda-parivarattar
 Keralantaka-terinda-parivarattar
 Mulaparivara-vitteru alias Jananatha-terinda-parivarattar
 Singalantaka-terinda-parivarattar
 Sirudanattu Vadugakkalavar
 Valangai-Parambadaigalilar
 Sirudanattu-Valangai-Velaikkarappadaigal
 Aragiya- Chola-terinda-Valangai-Velaikkarar
 Aridurgalanghana-terinda-Valangai-Velaikkarar
 Chandaparakrama-terinda-Valangai-Velaikkarar
 Ilaiya-Rajaraja-terinda-Valangai-Velaikkarar
 Kshatriyasikhamani-terinda-Valangai-Velaikkarar
 Murtavikramabharana-terinda-Valangai-Velaikkarar
 Rajakanthirava-terinda-Valangai-Velaikkarar
 Rajaraja-terinda-Valangai-Velaikkarar
 Rajavinoda-terinda-Valangai-Velaikkarar
 Ranamukha-Bhima-terinda-Valangai-Velaikkarar
 Vikramabharana-terinda-Valangai-Velaikkarar
 Keralantaka-vasal-tirumeykappar
 Anukka-vasal-tirumeykappar — Personal bodyguards
 Parivarameykappargal — Personal bodyguards
 Palavagai-Parampadaigalilar
 Perundanattu-Valangai-Velaikkarappadaigal

Velaikkarappadaigal or Velaikkarar is the equivalent of "Guards regiment" or "King's Regiment"—a royal suffix given in honor of their loyalty and bravery. Some historians like Stein also propose that they were drawn from the civilian population during wartime, suggesting they were more like a national guard. They are mentioned in the Mahavamsa; according to that account, the Sinhalese kingdom tried to use them as mercenaries against the Chola empire. They were later silenced and decommissioned when they refused and rebelled.

There are almost seventy of such regiments that have been found in these inscriptions. In most of the foregoing names, the first portion appears to be the surnames or titles of the king himself or that of his son. That these regiments were called after the king or his son shows the attachment that the Chola king bore towards his army.

It may not be unreasonable to suppose that these royal names were prefixed to the designations of these regiments after they had distinguished themselves in some engagement or other. It is worthy of note that there are elephant troops, cavalry and foot soldiers among these regiments.

Top officers took various titles after the different kings such as Rajaraja chola Brahmarajan, Rajarajakesari Muvendavelar, Jayamkondachola Villuparaiyar, Uttamachola Muvendavelar, Manukula Muvendavelar, Nittavinotha Muvendavelar, Atirajendra Muvendavelar, Mummudi chola pallavaraiyar, and Viranarayanan Muvendavelan.

Garrisons 
The army was stationed throughout the country in the form of local garrisons and in cantonments called Kadagams. The Cholas also stationed garrisons outside the country to consolidate the administration of their conquered territories. Following the Chola conquest of Anuradhapura, Senathipathi of the Sri Lanka Front Army of Rajaraja l and Rajendra I, Vallavaraiyan Vandiyadevan, garrisoned the city of Polonnaruwa to administer control over the island and deter any attempt of reconquest by the Sinhalese armies. After the troubles in the Pandya country, Kulothunga Chola I stationed his army in a number of military colonies along the main route to Pandya from Chola lands. One such colony was found at Kottaru and another at Madavilagam near South Arcot district in Tamil Nadu.

Navy 

The maritime force of Cholas was formed from ships used for trade, as they did not have a dedicated ship for naval combat. The ships were used for transporting the land army overseas.

Notes

References 
 
 
 
 
 

Military
Military history of India